DXFQ (103.1 FM), on-air as Radyo Bandera 103.1 News FM, is a radio station owned and operated by Bandera News Philippines. Its studios and transmitter are located at the 2nd Floor, Dinopol Bldg., South Osmeña St., Brgy. Dadiangas South, General Santos. It is Bandera News FM's second station in Mindanao after Bukidnon.

References

External links
Radyo Bandera General Santos FB Page

Radio stations in General Santos
Radio stations established in 2016